Hylexetastes is a genus of birds in the Dendrocolaptinae subfamily.

Species
The genus contains the following species:

However, a phylogenetic study found support for at least five evolutionary species in Hylexetastes: the four species above and H. undulatus (currently included in the Bar-bellied woodpecker).

References

External links

 
Bird genera
Taxa named by Philip Sclater
Taxonomy articles created by Polbot